Anarsia asymmetrodes is a moth in the family Gelechiidae. It was described by Kyu-Tek Park in 2014. It is found in Korea, where it has been recorded from the island of Baengnyeongdo.

The wingspan is 14–15 mm. The forewings are pale orange grey, speckled with dark-brown scales. There is a short basal blackish streak on the costa and the median costal patch is blackish, large and trapezoidal. There are two to three small, dark-brownish marks before and beyond the median costal patch. The hindwings are uniform greyish.

Etymology
The species name is derived from the Greek asymmetros (meaning without symmetry) with the Greek suffix -odes.

References

asymmetrodes
Moths described in 2014
Moths of Korea